Daulat-uz-Zaman (1947–2002) was a fast bowler who played first-class cricket for different teams in East Pakistan in the 1960s. Later, in 1979, he represented Bangladesh in the first ICC trophy tournament in England.

In 22 first-class matches he took 40 wickets at 35 apiece, with a career best of 5/105.

In the 1979 ICC Trophy he took 6 wickets at an average of 12.33. His best, 4/23, came against Malaysia.

After retiring as a player, he was involved with Victoria Sporting Club, one of the oldest cricket clubs in Dhaka (named after the empress). While attending a club match involving his beloved club, he died of a heart attack in March 2002.

See also
Marylebone Cricket Club cricket team in Bangladesh in 1976-77

References

East Pakistan cricketers
Bangladeshi cricketers
20th-century Bangladeshi cricketers
Cricketers from Dhaka
Public Works Department cricketers
East Pakistan Whites cricketers
East Zone (Pakistan) cricketers
1947 births
2002 deaths
Recipients of the Bangladesh National Sports Award